The Orchard is a Canadian country music duo made up of singer-songwriters Kasha Anne and Mitch Smith. They are signed to Royalty Records and have distribution through Sony Music Entertainment. Their debut album, Southern Ground, was released in 2012 with all five singles charting in the top 100 of the Trax Country Radio Charts. The Orchard's second album, Georgia, was released in 2014 and features the singles "She Don’t Play Fair" and "Angel Eyes". At the 2014 Association of Country Music in Alberta (ACMA) Awards, The Orchard received five nominations for “Group or Duo of the Year”, “Fans Choice”, “Album of the Year”, “Rising Star” and two songs nominated for “Song of the Year”.  Their third album The Great Unknown was released on March 10, 2017.

Discography

Studio albums

Singles

References

External links
 

Country music duos
Musical groups established in 2012
Canadian country music groups
Canadian musical duos
Musical groups from Edmonton
2012 establishments in Alberta